Joseph-Guillaume Barthe (March 16, 1816 – August 4, 1893) was a lawyer, journalist and political figure in Canada East. He also  wrote for the Montreal newspaper Le Populaire under the pseudonym Marie-Louise.

Life
Barthe was born March 16, 1816, in Carleton, Lower Canada. He attended Séminaire de Nicolet for seven years between 1827 and 1834. Although finishing first year Philosophy at Nicolet, when he returned for the second year he could not successfully complete the philosophy program. Shifting his interests to medicine, he studied under Dr. René-Joseph Kimber. After unsuccessfully studying medicine, Barthe would later study law with Edward Barnard.

In 1838, he wrote a poem ; as a result, he was put in jail at Trois-Rivières for three months.

Completing his legal education, he was called to the bar on March 17, 1840. In the same year, he became editor of the Montreal newspaper L’Aurore des Canadas. 

1841, Barthe was elected to the Legislative Assembly of the Province of Canada for Yamaska.  He was defeated in the next general election in 1844. He married Louise-Adélaïde Pacaud, the daughter of Joseph Pacaud and sister of Édouard-Louis Pacaud in 1844. In 1846, he was appointed clerk in the Court of Appeals. 

His daughter Émilie Barthe was born on March 26, 1849. She would eventually become the center of a political scandal.

Joseph-Guillaume moved to France and lived there from 1853 to 1855. During his time there, he attempted to encourage stronger ties between France and French Canadians, publishing a book Le Canada reconquis par la France. He returned to Trois-Rivières, serving as editor for newspapers there. Barthe then moved to Quebec City, where he was co-editor of Le Canadien for a time. He later moved to Montreal, where he died in 1893.

His brother Georges-Isidore also became a lawyer and journalist and served in the Canadian House of Commons.

References

External links
 
 

1818 births
1893 deaths
Members of the Legislative Assembly of the Province of Canada from Canada East
People from Carleton-sur-Mer